Kathleen Leahy (born 29 October 1993) is an indoor and field hockey player from Canada.

Personal life
Kathleen Leahy was born and raised in Victoria, British Columbia.

Career

Indoor hockey
Leahy made her debut for the Canadian Indoor team in 2017, at the Indoor Pan American Cup in Georgetown.

Four years later she represented the team again, winning a silver medal at her second Indoor Pan American Cup in Spring City.

Field hockey
Kathleen Leahy debuted for the national team in 2013 during an international tour to Europe.

Leahy spent years in the national team before appearing in her first major tournament, the XXI Commonwealth Games in the Gold Coast.

She won her first medal in 2022, taking home bronze at the Pan American Cup in Santiago.

References

External links

Kathleen Leahy at Field Hockey Canada

1993 births
Living people
Canadian female field hockey players
Female field hockey defenders

Field hockey players at the 2018 Commonwealth Games
2023 FIH Indoor Hockey World Cup players